Flavius Philagrius (335–350) was a Roman state official under the emperors Constantine I and his son Constantius II. He served two terms as governor of Egypt (335–37 and 338–40), and finally as governor of Pontus in northern Anatolia. During his term of office in Egypt, he threatened and helped exile the trinitarian bishop of Alexandria, Athanasius, on behalf of the Arians, and throughout his career he acted in support of the Arian cause against adherents of the creed of Nicaea.

Biography
Flavius Philagrius was a native of Cappadocia, and apparently belonged to an upper-class family, for, like other members of the elite in the eastern Roman provinces, he studied at Athens. In 335 the Emperor Constantine appointed Philagrius as prefect (governor) of Egypt. He was the first man of senatorial rank to hold that office; the previous holders had all belonged to the equestrian order. That year, Philagrius, an Arian, assisted the Synod of Tyre in its proceedings against Athanasius, the trinitarian bishop of Alexandria. Athanasius accused Philagrius of obtaining evidence against him by threatening witnesses.

As prefect Philagrius probably oversaw a general collection of corn to supply Constantine's abortive invasion of Persia in 337, though he seems to have left office already before the Emperor's death on 22 May. He was reappointed in 338 by Constantine's son, Constantius II, to carry out the deposition of Athanasius and further the interests of the Arian party there. The prefect removed Athanasius from his see in March 339 (though he failed to arrest him) and replaced him with the fellow Cappadocian Gregory. Philagrius responded to resistance in the city by plundering and setting ablaze a church belonging to the former bishop's adherents.

In 343–344 Philagrius is attested as a comes at the court of Emperor Constantius. Following the ecumenical council of Serdica in 343, he used his position to support the Arians at Philippopolis and Adrianople in Thrace. Later in the decade he served as governor of Bithynia and Capaddocia (vicar of Pontica), with his main role there being to maintain local supply lines for the war against Persia in the eastern border. In 348, during his term of office, he helped the famous Antiochene rhetor Libanius in a lawsuit, and from then on the two became friends. He was still in office in 350, when Paul, a former bishop of Constantinople whom the Emperor had banished, died at Cucusus (Göksun), in his province.

Philagrius was married, and died before 358. He had a brother who served as governor of Augustamnica in Egypt.

Citations

References
 
 
 
 
 
 

350s deaths
4th-century Arian Christians
4th-century Roman governors of Egypt
4th-century Romans
Comites
Roman governors of Cappadocia
Senators of the Roman Empire